Cisco is a village in Piatt County, Illinois, United States. The population was 264 at the 2000 census.

Geography

Demographics

There were 109 households, out of which 28.4% had children under the age of 18 living with them, 72.5% were married couples living together, 5.5% had a female householder with no husband present, and 21.1% were non-families. 20.2% of all households were made up of individuals, and 7.3% had someone living alone who was 65 years of age or older. The average household size was 2.42 and the average family size was 2.78.

In the village, the population was spread out, with 20.8% under the age of 18, 6.8% from 18 to 24, 27.3% from 25 to 44, 25.8% from 45 to 64, and 19.3% who were 65 years of age or older. The median age was 40 years. For every 100 females, there were 92.7 males. For every 100 females age 18 and over, there were 93.5 males.

The median income for a household in the village was $40,625, and the median income for a family was $43,750. Males had a median income of $35,625 versus $18,125 for females. The per capita income for the village was $17,722. About 7.0% of families and 8.3% of the population were below the poverty line, including 16.0% of those under the age of 18 and 4.2% of those 65 or over.

See also

 List of municipalities in Illinois

References

External links

Villages in Piatt County, Illinois
Villages in Illinois